Mustapha Baitas (born 1978) is the Moroccan Delegate-Minister to the Head of Government in charge of Relations with Parliament, Government Spokesman. He was appointed as minister on 7 October 2021.

Education 
Baitas holds a Bachelors of Laws from the École nationale d'architecture in Rabat.

References 

1978 births
Living people
21st-century Moroccan politicians
Moroccan politicians
Government ministers of Morocco